Yevhen Kanana (born 27 March 1953) is a Soviet footballer and referee of the Soviet Union and Ukraine.

Key matches
 1988 Soviet League Cup Final
 1990 Soviet League Cup Final
 1992 Ukrainian Cup Final

External links
 Interview to Futbolny klub
 Profile at football facts
 Profile at allplayers.in
 1992-93 season of Ukrainian Premier League

1953 births
Living people
Footballers from Donetsk
Sportspeople from Donetsk
Soviet footballers
Soviet football referees
Ukrainian football referees
FC Shakhtar Donetsk players
FC Mariupol players
FC Orenburg players
FC Vostok players
Ukrainian sports executives and administrators
FC Mariupol
FC Shakhtar Donetsk non-playing staff
Association football midfielders